Liga Mayor de Fútbol may refer to:

 Liga Mayor de Futbol de Honduras
 Primera División de Republica Dominicana
 Salvadoran Primera División